The 1944 United States Senate election in North Dakota took place on November 7, 1944. Incumbent Republican Senator Gerald Nye ran for re-election to his fourth term. He faced a serious challenge to his renomination in the Republican primary, with prominent Fargo attorney Lynn Stambaugh and Congressman Usher L. Burdick running against him. He won with one-third of the vote, defeating Shambaugh, his closest opponent, by fewer than 1,000 votes. In the general election, Stambaugh continued his campaign against Nye as an independent, splitting the Republican vote as Governor John Moses, the Democratic nominee, ran a strong campaign. Though Nye had benefited from crowded general elections before, he bled Republican support to Stambaugh and Moses unseated him with just 45% of the vote. However, just a few months into Moses's term, he died in office, flipping the seat back to Republican control and triggering a June 1946 special election.

Democratic Primary

Candidates
 John Moses, Governor of North Dakota

Results

Republican Primary

Candidates
 Gerald Nye, incumbent U.S. Senator
 Lynn Stambaugh, Fargo attorney, former national commander of the American Legion
 Usher L. Burdick, U.S. Congressman from North Dakota's at-large congressional district
 A. C. Townley

Results

General election

Results

References

1944
North Dakota
United States Senate